Dudu Tucci (full name: Eduardo Tucci da Silva; born May 5, 1955 in São Paulo) is a Brazilian percussionist, singer and composer.

Dudu Tucci grew up in a family with a musical background, and was already playing drums at very young age at umbanda-ceremonies. He studied classical percussion, flute and musicology at Brooklin Paulista Conservatory in São Paulo. After that he traveled throughout South-America to study Latin American music.

In 1978, he was invited to play in the symphonic orchestra in his home town. At the same time he met the well-known Brazilian dancer Ismael Ivo and both opened the "Experimental Black Dance Group".
After a cooperation with Arrigo Barnabé, Tucci was invited to the JazzFest Berlin, and has been living in Berlin since then.

Discography
 Oduduá (1990)
 Obátimalê (1992)
 Orishás (1994, Candomblé-music)
 Native Dreamer (1995)
 Tribal World (1995)
 Afoxé Loni (2002)
 Inaê (2004)
 Amacy (2005, Umbanda-music)
 Nadador (2006)

Books
 Samba und Sambistas in Brasilien. With Tiago de Oliveira Pinto. Noetzel Verlag, Wilhelmshaven 1992. (in German)

External links
 Dudu Tucci
 Afoxé Loni

1955 births
Living people
Brazilian percussionists
20th-century Brazilian male singers
20th-century Brazilian singers
Brazilian composers
Singers from São Paulo
Timbau players
21st-century Brazilian male singers
21st-century Brazilian singers